Albert Schiess (born 12 March 1951) is a Swiss sailor. He competed in the Tornado event at the 1976 Summer Olympics.

References

External links
 
 

1951 births
Living people
Swiss male sailors (sport)
Olympic sailors of Switzerland
Sailors at the 1976 Summer Olympics – Tornado
Place of birth missing (living people)
20th-century Swiss people